

First round selections

The following are the first round picks in the 1991 Major League Baseball draft.

Supplemental first round selections

Compensation picks

Other notable players
Kevin Stocker, 2nd round, 54th overall by the Philadelphia Phillies
Herbert Perry, 2nd round, 57th overall by the Cleveland Indians
Todd Hollandsworth, 3rd round, 80th overall by the Los Angeles Dodgers
Alex Ochoa, 3rd round, 82nd overall by the Baltimore Orioles
Jim Mecir, 3rd round, 84th overall by the Seattle Mariners
Chris Stynes, 3rd round, 94th overall by the Toronto Blue Jays
Desi Relaford, 4th round, 110th overall by the Seattle Mariners
Terry Adams, 4th round, 111th overall by the Chicago Cubs
Paul Byrd, 4th round, 112th overall by the Cleveland Indians
Brian Boehringer, 4th round, 124th overall by the Chicago White Sox
Nomar Garciaparra, 5th round, 130th overall by the Milwaukee Brewers, but did not sign
Dave Kennedy, 5th round, 142nd overall by the California Angles
John Mabry, 6th round, 155th overall by the St. Louis Cardinals
LaTroy Hawkins, 7th round, 180th overall by the Minnesota Twins
Tony Womack, 7th round, 201st overall by the Pittsburgh Pirates
Jason Schmidt, 8th round, 205th overall by the Atlanta Braves
Brad Radke, 8th round, 206th overall by the Minnesota Twins
Mike Matheny, 8th round, 208th overall by the Milwaukee Brewers
Derek Lowe, 8th round, 214th overall by the Seattle Mariners
Steve Trachsel, 8th round, 215th overall by the Chicago Cubs
Jon Lieber, 9th round, 241st overall by the Chicago Cubs, but did not sign
Mark Sweeney, 9th round, 246th overall by the California Angels
Scott Eyre, 9th round, 248th overall by the Texas Rangers
Mike Sweeney, 10th round, 262nd overall by the Kansas City Royals
Jeff Cirillo, 11th round, 286th overall by the Milwaukee Brewers
Sam Wood, 11th round, 290th overall by the Houston Astros
Joe Randa, 11th round, 288th overall by the Kansas City Royals
Mark Grudzielanek, 11th round, 295th overall by the Montreal Expos
Al Levine, 11th round, 306th overall by the Chicago White Sox
Matt Lawton, 13th round, 336th overall by the Minnesota Twins
Alex Gonzalez, 13th round, 354th overall by the Toronto Blue Jays
Bobby Higginson, 18th round, 473rd overall by the Philadelphia Phillies, but did not sign
Kirk Rueter, 18th round, 477th overall by the Montreal Expos
Ron Mahay, 18th round, 486th overall by the Boston Red Sox
Mike Cameron, 18th round, 488th overall by the Chicago White Sox
Albie Lopez, 20th round, 528th overall by the Cleveland Indians
Matt Mantei, 25th round, 656th overall by the Seattle Mariners
Ryan Franklin, 25th round, 666th overall by the Toronto Blue Jays, but did not sign
Bob Howry, 32nd round, 833rd overall by the Houston Astros, but did not sign
Orlando Palmeiro, 33rd round, 870th overall by the California Angels
Dustin Hermanson, 39th round, 1033rd overall by the Pittsburgh Pirates, but did not sign
Aaron Boone, 43rd round, 1127th overall by the California Angels, but did not sign
Damian Jackson, 44th round, 1148th overall by the Cleveland Indians
Jason Isringhausen, 44th round, 1157th overall by the New York Mets
Ken Grundt, 53rd round, 1354th overall by the San Francisco Giants

NFL players drafted 
Tony Banks, 10th round, 258th overall by the Minnesota Twins
Rob Johnson, 16th round, 414th overall by the Minnesota Twins, but did not sign
Frank Sanders, 26th round, 683rd overall by the Chicago Cubs, but did not sign
Steve McNair, 35th round, 916th overall by the Seattle Mariners, but did not sign
O. J. McDuffie, 41st round, 1077th overall by the California Angels, but did not sign
Mark Fields, 51st round, 1309th overall by the Seattle Mariners, but did not sign
Rodney Williams, 37th round, 964th overall by the Kansas City Royals

External links
Complete draft list from The Baseball Cube database

References

Major League Baseball draft
Draft
Major League Baseball draft